Mansfield was a municipal borough in Nottinghamshire, England from 1891 to 1974. It was created under the Municipal Corporations Act 1835.

The borough was abolished in 1974 under the Local Government Act 1972 and combined with Mansfield Woodhouse Urban District and Warsop Urban District to form the new Mansfield district.

Freedom of the Borough
The following people and military units have received the Freedom of the Borough of Mansfield.

Individuals
 John Harrop White: 1924.

References

Districts of England abolished by the Local Government Act 1972
Municipal boroughs of Nottinghamshire
Municipal Borough of